Bandar Tun Razak, Jengka formerly known as Bandar Pusat Jengka or Jengka Town Centre is an agricultural town in Maran District, Pahang, Malaysia.
Bandar Tun Razak is the centre of the Jengka Triangle which is known as FELDA Jengka. The Jengka Triangle (Malay: Segitiga Jengka), which is the largest FELDA settlement in Malaysia, is one of the successful of the Malaysian government's projects to eradicate poverty among its citizens.

List of FELDA settlements in Jengka Triangle

FELDA Jengka
FELDA Anggerik Jengka 1
FELDA Cempaka Jengka 2
FELDA Dahlia Jengka 3
FELDA Kemboja Jengka 4
FELDA Kekwa Jengka 5
FELDA Keembong Jengka 6
FELDA Kenanga Jengka 7
FELDA Kesidang Jengka 8
FELDA Kesumba Jengka 9
FELDA Mawar Jengka 10
FELDA Melati Jengka 11
FELDA Melor Jengka 12
FELDA Puteri Malu Jengka 13
FELDA Raya Jengka 14
FELDA Semarak Jengka 15
FELDA Sena Jengka 16
FELDA Seri Pagi Jengka 17
FELDA Seroja Jengka 18
FELDA Siantan Jengka 19
FELDA Tanjung Jengka 20
FELDA Teratai Jengka 21
FELDA Terkis Jengka 22
FELDA Tonkin Jengka 23
FELDA ayam Jengka 24
FELDA Bougainvillea Jengka 25

Others

FELDA Ulu Jempol 
FELDA Kampung Awah
FELDA Sungai Nerek
FELDA Sungai Tekam Utara
FELDA Sungai Tekam (Getah)
FELDA Kota Gelanggi 1
FELDA Kota Gelanggi 2
FELDA Kota Gelanggi 4
FELDA Padang Piol
FELDA Sungai Retang
FELDA Kota Gelanggi 3

Education
Universiti Teknologi Mara (UiTM) Bandar Pusat Jengka Campus
Kolej Sentral
Sekolah Kebangsaan Bandar Pusat
Sekolah Menengah Kebangsaan Jengka Pusat
Sekolah Kebangsaan Jengka Pusat 2
Sekolah Menengah Kebangsaan Jengka Pusat 2
Pahang Engineering Matriculation College (KMKPh)
Sekolah Menengah Kebangsaan Desa Jaya
Sekolah Kebangsaan Desa Jaya
Maahad As Sultan Ahmad Shah ad Dinni

Facilities
Hospital Jengka
Masjid Sultan Ahmad Shah, Bandar Pusat Jengka
Bank Islam Malaysia Bhd
Nukilan Bookstation Sdn Bhd
 AFFIN Bank
Bank Rakyat
Bank Simpanan Nasional
Maybank
Agro Bank
U-Mart
B5
7-Eleven
KFC
Anjung Selera (formerly Pagar Food Court)
Tabung Haji
Library
Pejabat Majlis Agama Islam dan Adat Istiadat Pahang
Police Station
Fire and Rescue Department
National Registration Office
Tenaga Nasional office
Terminal Bas Nadi Kota, Bandar Pusat Jengka
Jabatan Bekalan Air Pahang Office
Pusat Latihan Pertahanan Awam
Hiasindah Dobi (Laundry)()
Hotel Issoria Jengka
Rumah Tamu Dona Long (www.donalong.blogspot.com)
Travel Agent for flight tickets
 Ezycomp Network (computer services and accessories)
MYDIN Mall Bandar Tun Razak Jengka
Arrahnu Pejabat Pos
Tealive

Recreation area

Tun Abdul Razak Stadium football stadium and also home of the FELDA United football team
 Hutan Lipur Gunung Senyum
 Air Terjun Lubuk Yu-Ulu Jempul
 Air Terjun Lubuk Jit (Kuala Sentul)
 Gua Kota Gelanggi
 Tekam Plantation Resort
 Kolam pancing - Ulu jempol, Jengka 3,8,12,14,19, Kota Gelangi

References

Maran District
Towns in Pahang
Federal Land Development Authority settlements